{{Infobox person
| name        = Robert X. Cringely
| image       = Robert X Cringely keynote 2006-10-05.jpg
| caption     = Stephens (as Cringely) delivers the keynote speech at the 2006 CODI Conference in Salt Lake City.
| birth_name  = Mark Stephens
| birth_date  = 
| birth_place = Apple Creek, Ohio, U.S.
| death_date  = 
| death_place = 
| education   = BA, College of Wooster, 1975MA, Stanford University
| occupation  = Journalist, Technology writer
| spouse      = Mary Alyce
| known_for   = InfoWorld columnAccidental Empires: How the Boys of Silicon Valley Make Their Millions, Battle Foreign Competition and Still Can't Get a Date| website     = 
}}
Robert X. Cringely is the pen name of both technology journalist Mark Stephens and a string of writers for a column in InfoWorld, the one-time weekly computer trade newspaper published by IDG.

 InfoWorld 

Mark Stephens contributed to InfoWorld under the Cringely pseudonym. During Stephens' lengthy tenure (1987–1995), the character of Cringely changed dramatically (morphing from a private eye type to a slick, womanizing tech insider) and became an increasingly popular tech pundit after he published the book Accidental Empires: How the Boys of Silicon Valley Make Their Millions, Battle Foreign Competition and Still Can't Get a Date (1992).

After a financial disagreement in 1995, Stephens was dismissed from InfoWorld and was promptly sued by IDG to prevent him from continuing to use the Cringely trademark. A settlement was reached out of court that allowed him to use the name, so long as he did not contribute to competing technology magazines.

 Mark Stephens 

 Biography 

Stephens was born in 1953, in Apple Creek, Ohio. He earned a bachelor's degree from the College of Wooster in Ohio in 1975 and a Master's degree in Communication from Stanford University in 1979, where he also pursued work toward a doctorate. He served on the "Public's Right to Information Task Force" as part of the President’s Commission on the Accident at Three Mile Island. He has claimed he was employee #12 at Apple, Inc., though Daniel Kottke also claims this number.

Stephens' writing as Robert X. Cringely regularly appeared in publications such as Forbes, Newsweek, Success, The New York Times, Upside, and Worth. Stephens has also appeared as Cringely in two documentaries based on his writings: Triumph of the Nerds: The Rise of Accidental Empires (1996) and Nerds 2.0.1: A Brief History of the Internet (1998) and in a three-part documentary on PBS called Plane Crazy, in which he attempted to build an aircraft in 30 days and fly it when completed.  The project quickly fell behind schedule and he became angry with the film crew.  Eventually, he admitted defeat and the aircraft was cut up by Cringely.  In the final episode, he builds an existing kit designed and assisted by Fisher Aero.

As Cringely, Stephens produced and hosted an Internet television show called NerdTV (2005–06) for PBS and, until late 2008, wrote an online column for the PBS website called I, Cringely: The Pulpit''. On November 14, 2008, Stephens announced that he would stop contributing columns to PBS as of that December 15. He indicated that the move was his own decision "and not that of PBS, which has been nothing but good to me these many years". He also blogged for the Technology Evangelist site during 2007.

Today, his writings can be found at his own I, Cringely site.

References

External links

 I, Cringely at cringely.com
 I, Cringely at pbs.org via the Wayback Machine

1953 births
American male journalists
American technology writers
American television personalities
Male television personalities
Apple Inc. employees
Collective pseudonyms
College of Wooster alumni
Living people
20th-century pseudonymous writers
21st-century pseudonymous writers
People from Wayne County, Ohio
American technology journalists